Baddesley may refer to:

 Baddesley Clinton, Warwick - a moated manor house
 Baddesley Ensor, Warwickshire
 North Baddesley, Hampshire
Baddesley Preceptory
 South Baddesley, Hampshire